WD repeat-containing protein 62 is a protein that in humans is encoded by the WDR62 gene.

Function 
WDR62 is a scaffold protein and interacts with different kinases. WDR62 plays a role in mediating activation of the JNK pathway in response to TNFα. This finding might have implications in the research of TNFα related diseases such as autoimmune diseases and cancer. It has been also shown that WDR62 upregulation can lead to overproliferation of glia cells and potentially glioma and this is coupled with an upregulation in AURKA, AKT, MYC and PI3K signalling.

WDR62 effect on neurogenesis is regulated by MEKK3 in coordination with FBW7 (F-box and WD repeat domain-containing protein 7).

WDR62 has been  shown to have a regulatory role on hippocampus development and neurogenesis.

WDR62 is also involved in male spermatogenesis with an essential role in centriole duplication and manchette removal during the spermatogenesis process. The deficiency of WDR62  results in low sperm counts with defected motility, and abnormal morphology.

Clinical significance 
Mutations in the WDR62 gene cause of a wide spectrum of severe cerebral cortical malformations including microcephaly, pachygyria with cortical thickening, hypoplasia of the corpus callosum, polymicrogyria as well as microlissencephaly.

Cortical malformation, associated with WDR62 point mutations occurring in humans (V65M and R438H) has been linked to ciliopathies. These WDR62 point mutations drive ciliary disruption in Radial glial cell via disrupting the cilia and centrosome localization of CENPJ and the Intraflagellar transport protein 88 (IFT88), which are required for tubulin requitment to centrosome and transport of tubulin to the cilia tip, respectively.

References

Further reading